Robert Andrew "Bobby" Flynn (born 22 January 1981) is an Australian singer-songwriter. In the fourth season of the singing competition Australian Idol, he placed seventh.

With his band, The Omega Three, he made a nationwide tour through Australia in 2007, appearing in many regional centres including Burnie, Wagga Wagga, Townsville and Lismore.

Early life
Flynn was born on 22 January 1981 in Brisbane, Queensland. The second child of 42-year-old Josephine and to 52-year-old Kevin, an accountant. Flynn and his elder sister Sarah were raised in Coorparoo in Brisbane's east in a middle-class Catholic family with eclectic musical influences. He was educated at St Joseph's College, Gregory Terrace in Spring Hill, Queensland.

Australian Idol
Flynn performed his original composition "The Boy Had Trouble" in his Australian Idol (singing competition) audition in 2006, which landed him a spot in the Top 100. He was selected by the judges to go into the Top 24.

Flynn received his first "Touchdown" from Mark Holden in Week 5 (Disco Week) of the Finals, for his off-beat interpretation of Rick James' hit "Superfreak". Media coverage dubbed him a unique performer and 'revolution' for the idol competition.

Flynn was eliminated from the competition on 16 October, after performing "Rhiannon" by Fleetwood Mac. This came as a shock, as he had not landed in the bottom three before this, and had been widely touted both on the show and in the media as one of the strongest contenders. Flynn was invited back to the Tuesday night supplement to Idol, where he performed "The Boy Had Trouble".

Performances
Brisbane auditions: "The Boy Had Trouble" (original composition)
Theatre Round – Day two: "Beautiful Day" by U2
Top 24: "Under the Milky Way" by The Church
Week 1 – Contestant's Choice: "When the War Is Over" by Cold Chisel
Week 2 – Rock: "Werewolves of London" by Warren Zevon
Week 3 – #1 Hits: "Arthur's Theme (Best That You Can Do)" by Christopher Cross
Week 4 – Contestant's year of birth: "Under Pressure" by Queen and David Bowie
Week 5 – Disco: "Super Freak" by Rick James
Week 6 – Acoustic: "Rhiannon" by Fleetwood Mac
Week 6 – Up Close & Personal: "The Boy Had Trouble" by Bobby Flynn

Releases

Albums

EPs

Personal life 
Flynn and his partner have two children; Indigo, born August 2008, and a second child born on 21 July 2011.

References

External links
Official website (archived)
Australian Idol profile
Interview with Flynn on WHO.com
The Age article
SMH Article (5 October 2006)
SMH Article (18 October 2006)
SMH Article (23 October 2006)
http://www.theage.com.au/news/entertainment/tv-radio/2009/06/10/1244313184471.html

1981 births
Australian people of Irish descent
Australian Idol participants
Musicians from Brisbane
Australian singer-songwriters
People educated at St Joseph's College, Gregory Terrace
Living people
21st-century Australian singers
21st-century Australian male singers
Australian male singer-songwriters